Corbasca is a commune in Bacău County, Western Moldavia, Romania. It is composed of seven villages: Băcioiu, Corbasca, Marvila, Pogleț, Rogoaza, Scărișoara and Vâlcele.

At the 2011 census, 64.5% of inhabitants were Romanians and 35.4% Roma.

References

Communes in Bacău County
Localities in Western Moldavia